Peratherium is a genus of metatherian mammals in the family Herpetotheriidae that lived in Europe and Africa from the Early Eocene to the Early Miocene. Species include the following:
Peratherium africanum
Peratherium antiquum
Peratherium bretouense
Peratherium cayluxi
Peratherium constans
Peratherium cuvieri
Peratherium elegans
Peratherium lavergnense
Peratherium matronense
Peratherium monspeliense
Peratherium perrierense
Peratherium sudrei

References

Further reading

External links 

Prehistoric metatherians
Oligocene mammals
Oligocene mammals of Europe
Paleogene France
Fossils of France
Quercy Phosphorites Formation
Prehistoric mammal genera